The following is a partial list of United States of America (U.S.) communities with Native-American majority populations.  It includes United States cities and towns in which a majority (over half) of the population is Native American (American Indian or Alaska Native), according to data from the 2000 Census.

This list does not include locations in which the 2000 Census shows a plurality of the residents are Native American.

The list is organized by state and, within each state, by population size. The percentage of each city's population that is Native American is listed in parentheses next to the city's name. It includes 23 states and 486 communities.

This is one of the lists of U.S. cities with non-white majority populations.

Alaska
Places with 1,000 to 10,000 people

Utqiaġvik (57.2%)
Bethel (61.8%)
Dillingham (52.6%)
Hooper Bay (93.7%) 
Kotzebue (71.2%)
Metlakatla (81.8%)
Nome (51.0%)

Places with fewer than 1,000 people

Arizona
Places with 1,000 to 10,000 people

Places with fewer than 1,000 people

California
Furnace Creek (66.7%)

Colorado
Places with 1,000 to 10,000 people
Towaoc (94.4%)

Idaho
Places with 1,000 to 10,000 people
 Fort Hall (65.4%)
 Lapwai (81.4%)

Maine
Places with fewer than 1,000 people
Passamaquoddy Indian Township Reservation (83.4%)
Passamaquoddy Pleasant Point Reservation (88.6%)
Penobscot Indian Island Reservation, Penobscot County (84.9%)

Michigan
Places with 1,000 to 10,000 people
Bay Mills Township (51.40%)

Minnesota
Places with 1,000 to 10,000 people
Little Rock (98.9%)
Red Lake (97.7%)

Places with fewer than 1,000 people
Bena (70.0%)
Cass Lake (64.4%)
North Cass (63.2%)
Ponemah (99.2%)
Redby (97.8%)
Squaw Lake (63.6%)
Upper Red Lake (60.0%)
White Earth (93.6%)

Mississippi
Places with 1,000 to 10,000 people
Pearl River (80.4%)

Places with fewer than 1,000 people
Bogue Chitto (92.7%)
Conehatta (76.0%)
Redwater (76.5%)
Standing Pine (82.1%)
Tucker (92.9%)

Montana
Places with 1,000 to 10,000 people
Browning (90.5%)
Crow Agency (95.7%)
Lame Deer (92.5%)
North Browning (93.3%)
South Browning (94.4%)
Wolf Point (50.5%)

Places with fewer than 1,000 people
Agency (93.5%)
Ashland (75.2%)
Azure (95.3%)
Birney (86.1%)
Boneau (97.4%)
Box Elder (94.8%)
Brockton (84.9%)
Busby (89.5%)
East Glacier Park Village (51.8%)
Frazer (92.5%)
Harlem (52.2%)
Heart Butte (93.7%)
Lodge Grass (86.7%)
Muddy (94.3%)
Parker School (97.6%)
Poplar (63.7%)
Pryor (84.9%)
St. Pierre (97.4%)
St. Xavier (52.2%)
Sangrey (95.8%)
Starr School (97.2%)
Wyola (79.0%)

Nebraska
Places with fewer than 1,000 people
Macy (96.4%)
Santee (89.1%)
Walthill (67.9%)
Whiteclay (64.3%)
Winnebago (91.9%)

Nevada
Places with 1,000 to 10,000 people
Owyhee (75.0%)

Places with fewer than 1,000 people
McDermitt (97.4%)
Nixon (96.4%)
Schurz (83.6%)
Wadsworth (64.8%)

New Mexico
Places with 1,000 to 10,000 people

Places with fewer than 1,000 people

New York
Places with 1,000 to 10,000 people
Allegany Reservation (53.8%)
Cattaraugus Reservation, Erie County (86.8%)
Onondaga Reservation (51.8%)
St. Regis Mohawk Reservation (97.4%)

Places with fewer than 1,000 people
Cattaraugus Reservation, Cattaraugus County (95.6%)
Cattaraugus Reservation, Chautauqua County (73.9%)
Poospatuck Reservation (79.3%)
Shinnecock Reservation (91.7%)

North Carolina
Places with 1,000 to 10,000 people
Cherokee (76.1%)
Pembroke (88.9%)

Places with fewer than 1,000 people
Prospect (96.2%)

North Dakota
Places with 1,000 to 10,000 people
Belcourt (95.4%)
New Town (66.9%)

Places with fewer than 1,000 people
Cannon Ball (94.2%)
Dunseith (71.0%)
East Dunseith (96.8%)
Fort Totten (98.8%)
Fort Yates (93.4%)
Four Bears Village (94.0%)
Mandaree (95.9%)
Parshall (54.5%)
St. John (55.6%)
Selfridge (59.2%)
Shell Valley (96.7%)
Solen (65.1%)
White Shield (98.6%)

Oklahoma
Places with fewer than 1,000 people
Belfonte (50.2%)
Bell (57.8%)
Bull Hollow (76.2%)
Cherry Tree (75.37%)
Chewey (63.0%)
Eldon (50.5%)
Flute Springs (61.5%)
Greasy (57.1%)
Lotsee (72.7%)
Marble City (66.5%)
Oaks (72.6%)
Old Eucha (71.7%)
Peavine (52.0%)
Pinhook Corners (56.5%)
Red Rock (73.7%)
Rocky Mountain (53.8%)
Sycamore, Delaware County (59.0%)
Twin Oaks (59.7%)
Zion (56.3%)

Oregon
Places with 1,000 to 10,000 people
Warm Springs (93.5%)

Places with fewer than 1,000 people
Chiloquin (51.5%)
Kirkpatrick (54.1%)
Mission (73.8%)

South Dakota
Places with 1,000 to 10,000 people
Fort Thompson (96.4%)
North Eagle Butte (92.3%)
Oglala (98.8%)
Pine Ridge (94.2%)
Rosebud (93.4%)

Places with fewer than 1,000 people
Allen (94.0%)
Antelope (96.7%)
Batesland (86.4%)
Bullhead (96.1%)
Dupree (70.7%)
Eagle Butte (80.3%)
Green Grass (96.6%)
Kyle (94.4%)
La Plant (100.0%)
Little Eagle (99.2%)
Lower Brule (94.8%)
Manderson-White Horse Creek (98.7%) 
Marty (90.3%)
McLaughlin (55.7%)
Mission (74.9%)
Parmelee (97.4%)
Peever (66.0%)
Porcupine (98.3%)
Ravinia (70.9%)
Spring Creek (100.0%)
St. Francis (96.2%)
Two Strike (97.0%)
Wanblee (97.2%)
White Horse (98.3%)
Whitehorse (94.3%)
Wounded Knee (98.8%)

Utah
Places with fewer than 1,000 people
Aneth (98.8%)
Fort Duchesne (90.2%)
Halchita (98.2%)
Mexican Hat (58.0%)
Montezuma Creek (96.1%)
Monument Valley (94.1%)
Navajo Mountain (96.8%)
Randlett (93.3%)
Tselakai Dezza (99.0%)
White Mesa (98.2%)
Whiterocks (93.8%)

Washington
Places with 1,000 to 10,000 people
White Swan (59.3%)

Places with fewer than 1,000 people
Chehalis Village (82.4%)
Inchelium (76.6%)
Nespelem (82.1%)
Nespelem Community (92.1%)
Neah Bay (78.2%)
Nisqually Indian Community (60.7%)
North Omak (73.5%)
Skokomish (78.9%)
Taholah (93.2%)

Wisconsin
Places with 1,000 to 10,000 people
Keshena (96.0%)
Lac du Flambeau (86.6%)
Legend Lake (70.3%)
Oneida (65.9%)

Places with fewer than 1,000 people
Chief Lake (77.0%)
Little Round Lake (89.9%)
Middle Village (94.0%)
Neopit (96.5%)
New Post (65.1%)
Odanah (92.5%)
Reserve (82.1%)
Zoar (93.5%)

Wyoming
Places with 1,000 to 10,000 people
Arapahoe (80.6%)
Ethete (94.2%)
Fort Washakie (92.6%)

Places with fewer than 1,000 people
Boulder Flats (63.3%)
Johnstown (53.4%)

National rankings
Places with 1,000 to 10,000 people
Kaibito, Arizona (99.2%) 
San Felipe Pueblo, New Mexico (99.2%)
Twin Lakes, New Mexico (99.2%)
Jemez Pueblo, New Mexico (99.1%)

Places with fewer than 1,000 people
Birch Creek, Alaska (100.0%)
La Plant, South Dakota (100.0%)
New Allakaket, Alaska (100.0%)
Pinehill, New Mexico (100.0%)
Spring Creek, South Dakota (100.0%)
Winslow West, Arizona (100.0%)
Zia Pueblo, New Mexico (99.8%)
Round Rock, Arizona (99.7%)
East Fork, Arizona (99.6%) 
Rock Springs, New Mexico (99.6%)
Brimhall Nizhoni, New Mexico (99.5%)
Sanostee, New Mexico (99.5%)
Nageezi, New Mexico (99.3%)
Little Eagle, South Dakota (99.2%)
Nazlini, Arizona (99.2%) 
Ponemah, Minnesota (99.2%)
Kaij Mek, Arizona (99.1%)
Nakaibito, New Mexico (99.1%)
Tonalea, Arizona (99.1%)
Huerfano, New Mexico (99.0%)
Tselakai Dezza, Utah (99.0%)

See also
List of U.S. counties with Native American majority populations

References

Native American
U.S. communities with Native American majority populations
Native American-related lists